Events from the year 1913 in Canada.

Incumbents

Crown 
 Monarch – George V

Federal government 
 Governor General – Prince Arthur, Duke of Connaught and Strathearn 
 Prime Minister – Robert Borden
 Chief Justice – Charles Fitzpatrick (Quebec) 
 Parliament – 12th

Provincial governments

Lieutenant governors 
Lieutenant Governor of Alberta – George H. V. Bulyea
Lieutenant Governor of British Columbia – Thomas Wilson Paterson
Lieutenant Governor of Manitoba – Douglas Cameron
Lieutenant Governor of New Brunswick – Josiah Wood 
Lieutenant Governor of Nova Scotia – James Drummond McGregor
Lieutenant Governor of Ontario – John Morison Gibson
Lieutenant Governor of Prince Edward Island – Benjamin Rogers 
Lieutenant Governor of Quebec – François Langelier
Lieutenant Governor of Saskatchewan – George William Brown

Premiers 
Premier of Alberta – Arthur Sifton
Premier of British Columbia – Richard McBride 
Premier of Manitoba – Rodmond Roblin
Premier of New Brunswick – James Kidd Flemming
Premier of Nova Scotia – George Henry Murray 
Premier of Ontario – James Whitney
Premier of Prince Edward Island – John Alexander Mathieson
Premier of Quebec – Lomer Gouin
Premier of Saskatchewan – Thomas Walter Scott

Territorial governments

Commissioners 
 Commissioner of Yukon – George Black 
 Gold Commissioner of Yukon – George P. MacKenzie 
 Commissioner of Northwest Territories – Frederick D. White

Events
March 27 – Le Droit first published in French
April 17 – 1913 Alberta general election: Arthur Sifton's Liberals win a third consecutive majority 
June 2 – The High Level Bridge (Edmonton) opens, with two lanes of traffic on the lower deck, and two streetcar tracks and one CPR track on the upper deck
November 7 – November 8 – A storm on the Great Lakes sinks some thirty-four ships
November 17 – The National Transcontinental Railway is completed

Sport 

March 1 – The Quebec Bulldogs win their second Stanley Cup.
March 7 – The Victoria Senators win their first Pacific Coast Hockey Association championship.
November 29 – The Hamilton Tigers win their first Grey Cup by defeating the Toronto Parkdale Canoe Club 44 to 2 in the 5th Grey Cup played at Hamilton, Ontario's A.A.A. Grounds.

 Unknown - The Winnipeg Hockey Club defeats the Edmonton Eskimos to win the 1913 Allan Cup.

Unknown date

June – Start of the Canadian Arctic Expedition 1913–1916 a scientific expedition in the Arctic Circle organized and led by Vilhjalmur Stefansson.
Laura Secord Chocolates opens

Arts and literature

New Books
Maria Chapdelaine

Births

January to June
January 13 – Philip Gaglardi, politician (d. 1995)
March 11 – John Weinzweig, composer (d. 2006)
March 24 – Émile Benoît, musician (d. 1992)
April 4 – Jules Léger, diplomat and Governor General of Canada (d. 1980)
April 24 – Violet Archer, composer, teacher, pianist, organist and percussionist (d. 2000)
April 30 – Edith Fowke, folk song collector, author and radio presenter (d. 1996)
May 27 – James Page Mackey, chief of Toronto Police Service (d. 2009)
June 12 – Jean Victor Allard, general and first French-Canadian to become Chief of the Defence Staff (d. 1996)
June 14 – Joe Morris, trade unionist and president of the Canadian Labour Congress (d. 1996)
June 18 – Wilfred Gordon Bigelow, heart surgeon (d. 2005)

July to December
July 6 – J. Carson Mark, mathematician who worked on development of nuclear weapons (d. 1997)
July 16 – Woodrow Stanley Lloyd, politician and 8th Premier of Saskatchewan (d. 1972)
August 28
Robertson Davies, novelist, playwright, critic, journalist and professor (d. 1995)
Rose Goldblatt, administrator, pianist and teacher (d. 1997)
September 20 – Robert Christie, actor and director (d. 1996)
October 5 – Horace Gwynne, boxer and Olympic gold medalist (d. 2001)
November 7 – Elizabeth Bradford Holbrook, portrait sculptor (d. 2009)
November 8 – June Havoc, actress, dancer, writer, and theater director (d. 2010)
November 16 – Dora de Pedery-Hunt, sculptor and coin and medal designer (d. 2008)
November 21 – Stewart McLean, politician (d. 1996)
December 7 – Donald C. MacDonald, politician (d. 2008)
December 12 – Clint Smith, ice hockey player and coach (d. 2009)
December 16 – George Ignatieff, diplomat (d. 1989)
December 27 – Elizabeth Smart, poet and novelist (d. 1986)

Deaths
March 7 – Pauline Johnson, poet, writer and performer (b. 1861)
April 12 – Alexander Francis Macdonald, politician (b. 1818)
April 23 – Richard William Scott, politician and Minister (b. 1826)
May 4 – John M. Baillie, politician, member of the Nova Scotia House of Assembly (b. 1847)
July 15 – Hugh Richardson, jurist (b. 1826)

See also
 List of Canadian films

Historical documents
With Canada's promises unfulfilled, Premier calls for fair shake for Prince Edward Island

Editorial claims modern woman has best prospects in western Canada

"Few people[...]held life so lightly as these coast dwellers" - the "savage Indian" stereotype applied to Coast Salish people

Ambition and Canadian propaganda and incentives are motivating U.S. farmers to move to Canada (though some return)

With "slums as bad as any in the world,[...]the Montrealer takes little interest in the affair of his city."

House committee on pollution warned of widespread water-borne bacteria (especially typhoid) and general lack of water treatment

Nova Scotian looks back on his 12-year-old self fighting Fenians

Photo: Kwakwaka'wakw carving, Dsawadi, Knight Inlet, B.C. (later "collected" for museum)

References

 
Years of the 20th century in Canada
Canada
Canada